The 2017 Boston Marathon was the 121st running of the Boston Athletic Association's mass-participation marathon. It took place on Monday, April 17 (Patriots' Day in Massachusetts). Geoffrey Kirui won the men's race in 2:09:37 and Edna Kiplagat won the women's race in 2:21:52.

Kathrine Switzer at age 70 ran the marathon under bib number 261, the same number she had worn 50 years previously in 1967, finishing in 4:44:31. That number was then retired from all future Boston Marathons. Women were not allowed to run marathons until 1972, but she registered under the name K. V. Switzer.

Course 

The event ran along the same winding course the Marathon has followed for many decades 26miles 385yards (42.195 km) of roads and city streets, starting in Hopkinton and passing through six Massachusetts cities and towns, to the finish line beside the Boston Public Library, on Boylston Street in Boston's Copley Square.

Results

Wheelchair

References

External links 

 Official website

Boston Marathon
Boston
Boston Marathon
Boston Marathon
Boston Marathon
Marathon